Alberto Santelli (born 14 June 1953) is a Uruguayan footballer. He played in 13 matches for the Uruguay national football team from 1975 to 1983. He was also part of Uruguay's squad for the 1983 Copa América tournament.

References

1953 births
Living people
Uruguayan footballers
Uruguay international footballers
Place of birth missing (living people)
Association football forwards
Peñarol players
Defensor Sporting players
Atlético Junior footballers
Independiente Santa Fe footballers
Uruguayan expatriate footballers
Expatriate footballers in Colombia